Gareth Williams, born 12 March 1967) is an English former professional footballer. He usually played in midfield, but also played as a winger.

External links

1967 births
Living people
People from Cowes
Association football midfielders
English footballers
East Cowes Victoria Athletic A.F.C. players
Gosport Borough F.C. players
Aston Villa F.C. players
Barnsley F.C. players
Hull City A.F.C. players
AFC Bournemouth players
Northampton Town F.C. players
Scarborough F.C. players
Ilkeston Town F.C. (1945) players
Gainsborough Trinity F.C. players
Matlock Town F.C. players
English Football League players
English football managers
Matlock Town F.C. managers